Commanda Glacier is a steep glacier flowing eastward from Mount Newall to the south of Mount Ponder in the Asgard Range, Victoria Land. The glacier enters lower Newall Glacier westward of Sagittate Hill. It was named by the New Zealand Geographic Board (1998) because Antarctica NZ installed a radio repeater on nearby Mount Newall; "Commanda" was the model name for a high frequency radio used by early New Zealand field parties.

References
 

Glaciers of Victoria Land
Scott Coast